Deerwood is a locality in south central Manitoba, Canada. It is located approximately 31 kilometers (19 miles) northwest of Morden, Manitoba in the Rural Municipality of Thompson.

The Post Office was established on 2-21-5W in 1895 and closed in 1968. It was a railway point on the Northern Pacific Railway and was named by a railway official for the number of deer in a heavily wooded area while railway construction was taking place. It was also a School District from 1908 to 1951.

Climate
According to the Köppen Climate Classification system, Deerwood has a humid continental climate, abbreviated "Dfb" on climate maps.

References 

 Geographic Names of Manitoba (pg. 62) - Deerwood - the Millennium Bureau of Canada

Localities in Manitoba
Unincorporated communities in Pembina Valley Region